Irene Treppler (October 13, 1926 – October 21, 2012) was an American politician who served in the Missouri House of Representatives from 1973 to 1985 and in the Missouri Senate from the 1st district from 1985 to 1997.

She died of complications from dementia on October 21, 2012, in St. Louis, Missouri at age 86.

References

1926 births
2012 deaths
Republican Party members of the Missouri House of Representatives
Republican Party Missouri state senators
Deaths from dementia in Missouri
Women state legislators in Missouri